Maram Naga may refer to:
 Maram Naga people (Maram Nagas) - Maram people
 Maram Naga language - Maram language